Matko Jelavić (born 29 March 1958 in Split) is a Croatian singer, songwriter, composer and drummer. He started his career with the Split rock band Metak in 1978, where he was the drummer until the band dissolved in 1981. Later he started composing and writing songs for other Croatian singers, until his debut as a singer on the 1988 Split Festival where he won with his song and biggest hit "Majko stara". He lives in Split with his wife and two children.

External links 
 Official site

1958 births
Living people
Croatian pop singers
20th-century Croatian male singers
Musicians from Split, Croatia